The following is a list of the current in service 64 stations and the other planned stations on the Cairo Metro.

Line 1

Line 2

Line 3

The currently in service section of this line is station between Kitkat Station and  Adly Mansour Station

Future lines

Line 4
 Hadayek Al Ashgar حدائق الأشجار
 Ahram Gardens حدائق الأهرام
 ُEl Nasr النصر
 The Grand Egyptian Museum المتحف المصري الجديد
 Remaya Square ميدان الرماية
 Pyramids الأهرام
 Maryoteya المريوطية
 Arish العريش
 El Matbaa المطبعة
 Talbeya الطالبية
 Madkor مدكور
 El Mesaha المساحة
 Giza  الجيزة
 Interchange with Line 2
 Giza Square ميدان الجيزة
 Manyal المنيل
 El-Malek El-Saleh الملك الصالح
 Interchange with Line 1
 Magra El-Oyoun مجرى العيون
 Salah Eldin Citadel قلعة صلاح الدين
 ElMalek Mansour -Salah Salem Intersect- -الملك منصور -تقاطع صلاح سالم
 The 6th District -ElHay ElSadis- الحي السادس
 ElTayaran الطيران
 Abbas ElAkkad عباس العقاد
 Makram Ebeid مكرم عبيد
 Ahmed ElZomor أحمد الزمر
 El-Methaq الميثاق
 Police Academy أكاديمية الشرطة

This line is till under study, construction of the first phase (El Malek El Saleh - Giza) expected to start in early 2016 according to NAT.

Other lines
There are also plans for other lines including a circular line (Line 5) connecting Lines 1,2,3 and 4 along with the final line (Line 6) which will run from Shubra up-north until the heart of Maadi and Helwan districts in the south through running from Ataba Station (Interchange with both Line 2 and Line 3) through El Kalaa street شارع القلعة in bored tunnels to Salah Eldin Citadel Station (Interchange with Line 4) and moving on from there to both districts via bored tunnels using the existing route El-Mahager Railway as a guide through both Maadi and Helwan.

Both these lines will not take place before finishing both Line 3 and Line 4.

Notes

Metro stations
Cairo
 Cairo metro stations, List of
Metro stations
Cairo metro
Cairo metro